Carcasse is an abandoned populated place on the atoll of Diego Garcia in the British Indian Ocean Territory.

References

Geography of the British Indian Ocean Territory